This is a list of National Football League quarterbacks who have led the regular season in pass completion percentage each year. The record for completion percentage in a season is held by Drew Brees of the New Orleans Saints who completed 74.4% of his passes in 2018. Five quarterbacks have led the NFL in completion percentage in four different seasons (Sammy Baugh, Bart Starr, Joe Montana, Steve Young, Drew Brees), and one player (Len Dawson) achieved the same feat in the AFL. Dawson holds the NFL record for most consecutive seasons leading the league with six. Otto Graham led the AAFC in 1947 and the NFL three times (1953-1955).

Completion percentage leaders

Top 25 single-season completion percentage leaders

The NFL requires players to reach certain minimums to qualify as a leader in per-game stats, percentage stats, and passer rating. Since 1978 the minimum number is  14 pass attempts per team game (224 per season). These are the completion percentage leaders as compiled by Pro football reference.

Other leagues

All-America Football Conference (AAFC)

American Football League (AFL)

Most titles

See also
List of National Football League annual passing touchdowns leaders
List of National Football League annual passing yards leaders
List of National Football League annual passer rating leaders

References

Pass completion percentage leaders
National Football League lists